Baron Glenavy, of  Milltown in the County of Dublin, was a title in the Peerage of the United Kingdom. It was created on 26 July 1921 for the noted Irish lawyer and Unionist politician Sir James Campbell, 1st Baronet. He served as Lord Chief Justice of Ireland from 1916 to 1918 and as Lord Chancellor of Ireland from 1918 to 1921. Campbell had already been created a Baronet in the Baronetage of the United Kingdom in 1917. He was succeeded by his son, the second Baron. On his death the titles passed to his eldest son, the third Baron. Better known simply as  Patrick Campbell, he was a well-known journalist, humorist and television personality. He died without male issue and was succeeded by his younger brother, the fourth Baron. He never married and on his death in 1984 the baronetcy and barony became extinct.

Barons Glenavy (1921)
James Henry Mussen Campbell, 1st Baron Glenavy (1851–1931)
Charles Henry Gordon Campbell, 2nd Baron Glenavy (1885–1963)
Patrick Gordon Campbell, 3rd Baron Glenavy (1913–1980)
Michael Mussen Campbell, 4th Baron Glenavy (1924–1984)

References

Debrett's Peerage and Baronetage (1968 edition)

Extinct baronies in the Peerage of the United Kingdom
Noble titles created in 1921
Noble titles created for UK MPs
People from Milltown, Dublin